The Swedish Coastal Artillery has its origin in the Archipelago Artillery that was raised in 1866. The Coastal Artillery was formed from the Archipelago Artillery, the Marine Regiment and parts of the Artillery in 1902. Kustartilleriet, abbreviated KA, was an independent branch within the Swedish Navy until July 1, 2000, when the Swedish Coastal Artillery was disbanded and reorganised as the Swedish Amphibious Corps. The changed name and new structure were to reflect the new tasks that the old Coastal Artillery had moved to after the end of the Cold War and the demise of the Warsaw Pact.

History

The early years
Kustartilleriet or KA can trace its traditions as far back as the old coastal fortresses that were in use around Sweden since the 15th century. In the old days these would have been under the command structure of the fortress artillery department. The real first move to an independent branch was the creation of the Vaxholm Artillery Corps in 1889. Before this all coastal artillery units that were stationed on coastal defence fortresses or city fortresses were under the command of the fortress artillery department which in turn was a branch of the Artillery. Since the establishment of the fixed mine defence units during the 19th century, the question of an independent branch of the Swedish Armed Forces was again raised. This resulted in the creation of the modern Coastal Artillery in 1902 as an independent branch within the Royal Swedish Navy through a merge of Vaxholm Artillery Corps, Karlskrona Artillery Corps and the fixed mine defence units.

The modern Swedish Coastal Artillery is born
The units created out of the Fortress artillery corps from the army at Vaxholm Fortress and Karlskrona Fortress were merged with the Navy’s fixed mine companies and elements of the disbanded Marine Regiment (Marinregementet). This resulted in the creation of the first two regiments, Vaxholm Coastal Artillery Regiment (KA 1) and Karlskrona Coastal Artillery Regiment (KA 2).

Detachments from these two regiments were also responsible for keeping units at Fårösund Fortress on the northern tip of Gotland and at Älvsborg coastal fortresses, located near the main shipping channel into Gothenburg. During the First World War, it was also decided that the area of responsibility should also include the stationing of units at Hemsö and at Luleå (until 1953 a detachment from Älvsborg which, finally, in 1975, was made into a separate regiment, the Härnösand Coastal Artillery Regiment).

World War I

Interwar years
The detachment at Fårösund was reorganised as a separate unit in 1937 and renamed Gotland Coastal Artillery Regiment in 1937.

World War II
After a reduction in units after the 1925 defence proposition, there was a significant expansion of all the branches of the Swedish Armed Forces. In particular, the artillery in the Coastal Artillery was modernised and new materiel made in Sweden and imported (from e.g. Czechoslovakia) were introduced. The defense line built on the coast of Skåne during World War II was called the Per Albin Line. The detachment in Gothenburg was reorganised and expanded into the Älvsborg Coastal Artillery Regiment in 1942. During World War II and onwards, about 60 coastal artillery batteries were built along the Swedish coast.

Cold War
With the advent of Marinplan 60 there was a move towards standardization of equipment and an increase in mobile units, one of the most significant additions to the Swedish Coastal Artillery during the 1950s was the creation of the Coastal Ranger companies as a mobile reconnaissance and attack component.

The Swedish Coastal Artillery was up to the mid-1990s mostly a collection of fixed and mobile units located in the different Swedish archipelagos. The main purpose of the Swedish Coastal Artillery was to defend and maintain a visible presence in the Swedish archipelago, and even in peacetime maintain a high level of readiness. Units that where stationed around the more important shipping lanes and other naval installations around Sweden were fully manned, even in peacetime.

During the 1970s, the invasion threat to the coast very much a reality for the Swedish Armed Forces. Therefore, the guns made by Bofors with related combat management, radar and air defense received a powerful protection against all kinds of chemical warfare agents. During the 1980s there was a general move towards modernization in the Swedish defense forces and the Coastal Artillery received several new weapon systems in the 1980s and 1990s, like the new 12/70 TAP fixed artillery system, the mobile artillery system 12/80 KARIN, the Stridsbåt 90 combat craft and missile systems like the RBS-15 and RBS-17. The Coastal Artillery also modernized its ASW or anti-submarine capabilities in a response to the submarine incursions that plagued Sweden during the 1980s and early 1990s. Also, this was a step towards an increased ability to monitor and maintain high level of surveillance of Sweden’s harbours and shipping lanes against any foreign undersea aggression or incursion into Swedish territorial waters.

The Swedish Coastal Artillery was in a constant level of development during the last century as the threat levels changed around the world, the main threat to Sweden after the World War II was the threat of a war in Europe. Even if Sweden had not been directly involved, there was always a risk of an incursion into Sweden of a foreign power during a major war in Europe.

In 1986 and 1990, a change was made within the Swedish Navy's lower regional management level, where the coastal artillery defense was merged regionally with the naval bases. The new authority that was formed through the mergers was called naval command (marinkommando). Thus, all marine combat forces within each geographical area were led by a joint commander. Thus, the five geographical coastal artillery defenses were disbanded, which were integrated with the coastal artillery regiments in the new naval commands. The coastal artillery regiments remained with their own staffs within the command.

Swedish Amphibious Corps
The Defense Act of 2000 meant that the fixed coastal artillery would be completely disbanded. The decommissioning was carried out by the East Coast Naval Base and the South Coast Naval Base, as well as the Swedish Armed Forces Logistics. Most of the old guns were scrapped. Some batteries, such as Ellenabben in Karlskrona archipelago and the Femöre Fortress outside Oxelösund, were preserved. Some part of the battery at Landsort was also preserved. On 1 July 2000 the Swedish Amphibious Corps was organized, including Vaxholm Amphibian Regiment (Amf 1), Älvsborg Amphibian Regiment (Amf 4) and Amphibian Combat School (Amfibiestridsskolan, AmfSS).

Units

Coastal artillery defences

Coastal artillery brigades
A coastal artillery brigade was the highest unit the Swedish Coastal Artillery. From the late 1980s there were six brigades. Later, all but two coastal artillery brigades were renamed marine brigades (marinbrigader). Both naval and army units were included, and the personnel varied between 3,000 and 9,000 (In both KAB 1 and KAB 3, there were plenty of army units; KAB 1, for example, had 3 bicycle infantry battalions grouped for tasks at Väddö). The units were decommissioned from the war organization in the Defense Act of 2000.

Training units

Heraldry and traditions

Coat of arms
The coat of arms of the Swedish Coastal Artillery 1979–2000, the Coastal Artillery Center (Kustartillericentrum, KAC) 1995–1997 and the Swedish Amphibious Corps since 2000. Blazon: "Gules, two gunbarrels of older pattern in saltire above a flaming grenade and waves, all or".

Marsch
The march of Älvsborg Coastal Artillery Regiment (KA 4), ie Sam Rydberg's "I beredskap", was used as a joint coastal artillery march. In the autumn of 1985, composer Åke Dohlin thought that the Coastal Artillery should have its own march, and in this way "För kustartilleriet" was added. The march was dedicated to the then Inspector of Coastal Artillery, Senior Colonel Kjell Lodenius.

Commanding officers

Commanders of the Coastal Artillery
Commanders of the Coastal Artillery (Chefer för kustartilleriet, CKA)

1902–1907: Anders Fredrik Centerwall
1907–1909: Otto Ludvig Beckman
1909–1924: Herman Wrangel
1924–1929: Herman Wrangel
1929–1941: Tor Wahlman

Inspectors of the Coastal Artillery
Inspectors of the Coastal Artillery (Inspektörer för kustartilleriet, IKA)

1941–1953: Hjalmar Åström
1953–1961: Rudolf Kolmodin
1958–1960: Alf Nyman (acting)
1961–1964: Henrik Lange
1962–1969: Olof Karlberg (acting)
1964–1970: Arne Widner
1971–1980: Erik Lyth
1981–1985: Per-Erik Bergstrand
1985–1987: Kjell Lodenius
1987–1990: Ulf Rubarth
1990–1994: Nils Eklund
1994–1996: Per Lundbeck
1996–1997: Claes-Göran Hedén
1997–1998: Stellan Fagrell

See also
Cold war Swedish Coastal Artillery guns:
7.5 cm tornpjäs m/57
10.5 cm tornautomatpjäs m/50
12 cm tornautomatpjäs m/70

References

Notes

Print

Further reading

Military history of Sweden
Swedish Navy
Coastal artillery
World War II defensive lines
Fortifications in Sweden
1901 establishments in Sweden
Military units and formations established in 1901
2000 disestablishments in Sweden
Military units and formations disestablished in 2000
Artillery regiments of Sweden
Marine regiments